Ulf Mehlhorn (born 21 June 1968) is a German former professional footballer who played as a defender.

References

External links

1968 births
Living people
German footballers
East German footballers
Association football defenders
Fortuna Düsseldorf players
Chemnitzer FC players
1. FC Lokomotive Leipzig players
Bundesliga players
2. Bundesliga players
DDR-Oberliga players